Nina Shashkova (born 11 June 1947) is a Russian luger. She competed in the women's singles event at the 1972 Winter Olympics.

References

1947 births
Living people
Russian female lugers
Olympic lugers of the Soviet Union
Lugers at the 1972 Winter Olympics
Sportspeople from Moscow